The 2017 season was Kelantan's 9th season in the Liga Super since being promoted and 22nd successive season in the top flight of Malaysian football league system. They were competing in the Liga Super, Piala FA and Piala Malaysia after placed in 5th (7th after 3 points was deducted) in 2017 Liga Super first leg matches.

Season overview

November
On 30 November 2016, Zahasmi Ismail was appointed as the team new head coach, succeeding Velizar Popov in the role.

January
On 6 January 2017, it's confirmed that Kelantan would be participated in the 2017 Liga Super.

On 12 January 2017, former president, Annuar Musa was appointed as club advisor by Kelantan Football Association.

On 20 January 2017, Kelantan unveiled their 2017 season squad with new three foreign players, and new local players. Mamadou Danso and Alessandro Celin replaced Okiki Afolabi after he failed the club medical test and Cédric Djeugoué got issues with his registration documents. Mohammed Ghaddar have filled the place Asian quota player. New local players signed with Kelantan were Hasmizan Kamarodin, S. Subramaniam, S. Thinagaran and Hattaphon Bun An.

On 21 January 2017, the first league match between Kelantan and Melaka United scheduled at Sultan Muhammad IV Stadium in Kota Bharu has been postponed to another date due to bad weather caused waterlogged pitch.

On 27 January 2017, Kelantan started their league campaign with victory over PKNS with 3–1 scored.

Position at the end of January

AFC Club Ranking position in January

February
On 1 February 2017, league match against Johor Darul Ta'zim that was initially scheduled for 4 February 2017 will be postponed due to JDT's AFC Champions League commitments.

On 11 February 2017, Kelantan won 2–1 against FELDA United which was their second league match after having two games postponed before.

On 14 February 2017, during second round of Malaysia FA Cup campaign Kelantan were knocked out of the competition by Malaysia Premier League club PKNP 4–3 on penalty shoot-out after 1–1 draw after extra time.

On 21 February 2017, the rescheduled postponed rematch between Kelantan and Melaka United were held at Sultan Muhammad IV Stadium with the home team lost 0–2 and continued their streak of two games loses without any goals scored.

On 25 February 2017, the sixth league match of Kelantan at home ground ended up losing 0–2 to Selangor which continued their streak of loses without scoring goal in three matches in a row.

Position at the end of February

AFC Club Ranking position in February

March
On 1 March 2017, Kelantan secured the third league win over Perak in Perak Stadium. Mohammed Ghaddar scored a hat-trick and 1 goal came from Indra Putra Mahayuddin.

On 4 March 2017, Kelantan finally achieved their first win at their home ground after a straight three losses before and making it their second consecutive win in the league after beating T-Team 4–2 with Mohammed Ghaddar scored his second hat-trick and a goal came from Mohd Khairul Izuan Rosli.

On 7 March, Mohammed Ghaddar was announced as PFAM Player of the Month for February candidate.

Position at the end of March

AFC Club Ranking position in March

April
The team having a long break after the last match on 4 March 2017. This is due in conjunction with the Piala FA Matches. Kelantan started April league campaign with a defeat 1—2 against Pahang during home match in Kota Bharu. On 12 April, another rescheduled match between Kelantan against the defending champion, Johor Darul Ta'zim was held that resulted in another loss for Kelantan after the away team made a comeback to overturn the 2-goal lead from Kelantan both scored by Mohammed Ghaddar resulted in a 2–3 defeat. On 15 April, Kelantan continued their unbeaten streak outside of Sultan Muhammad IV Stadium by winning 5–1 against Penang with 4 goals contributed by Mohammed Ghaddar making it his third hat trick this season. On 29 April, Mohammed Ghaddar was announced as PFAM Player of the Month for April candidate. On 30 April, Alfredo Carlos González Machado has been appointed as the new technical director of the team and Sanna Nyassi was introduced as a potential candidate to replace Alessandro Celin in the second transfer window.

Position at the end of April

AFC Club Ranking position in April

May
On 1 May, Kelantan and Johor Darul Ta'zim were fined RM10,000 due to their fan action with  Kelantan fan were reported to have thrown bottles onto the pitch during the postponed match between Kelantan against Johor Darul Ta'zim.

On 2 May, Kelantan were deducted 6 points after failing to complete M-League registration process thus resulted in league standing change from number 5 to number 7.

On 6 May, Kelantan won 2–3 against Pahang making them still undefeated at away ground.

On 9 May, Mohammed Ghaddar was announced as the April Liga Super Player of the Month.

Second transfer window started on 15 May and will ended on 11 June, during this time span, some transfer activity among Kelantan FA player happened. Among them is Mohammed Ghaddar who was sold to Johor Darul Ta'zim for RM1,400,000.00 and his replacement, Abou Bakr Al-Mel from AC Tripoli.Nik Shahrul Azim was loaned out to Negeri Sembilan for 6 month.

On 24 May, Kelantan drew 2–2 against Penang at their home ground before the league take a rest period for more than a month due to Ramadan and national team games.

Position at the end of May

AFC Club Ranking position in May

June

There were no competitive matches played during this month. Fakhrul Zaman and Muhd Shahrul Hakim Rahim were loaned out to MISC-MIFA.

On 17 June, there were some changes in the club officials with Alfredo Carlos Gonzales will be taking Datuk Rosmadi Ismail place as the Team Manager while Datuk Rosmadi Ismail and his assistant Datuk Muhammad Nasir Hamzah will become the Contingent Leader and Assistant Contingent Leader respectively during any matchday involving the club.

On 18 June, the club were given 3 points back from the 6 points deduction thus making them goes up to 5th place.

Position at the end of June

July

Starting 1 July 2017, Kelantan has suffered 5 successive league defeats. Somehow, Kelantan began their Malaysia Cup campaign with winning against UiTM in their home match.

Position at the end of July

September
On 17 December 2017, Bibi Ramjani Ilias Khan was voted in as the new president of Kelantan Football Association for the term 2018–2021. She was appointed to the top post of the association after defeating Datuk Muhammad Nasir Hamzah in the voting process. Datuk Seri Afandi Hamzah defended his deputy president post, overcoming Datuk Rosmadi Ismail in the process.

Position at the end of September

Kit
Shirt Sponsor: HORC Main Sponsors: redONE, Al Hamra Group, Chengal Jati Official Sponsors: Yakult, Moccis Furniture, Puspamara, Sinar Harian, Ekspres Mutiara, Glow Glowing Gym Partner: PakaQ Gomo Gym

Source:

Competitions

Overview

{| class="wikitable" style="text-align: center"
|-
!rowspan=2|Competition
!colspan=8|Record
!rowspan=2|Started round
!rowspan=2|Current position / round
!rowspan=2|Final position / round
!rowspan=2|First match	
!rowspan=2|Last match
|-
!
!
!
!
!
!
!
!
|-
| Liga Super

| —
| 10th
| 10th
| 21 January
| 28 October
|-
| Piala FA

| Second Round
| Second Round
| Second Round
| 14 February
| 14 February
|-
| Piala Malaysia

| Group Stage
| Group Stage
| Group Stage
| 5 July
| 9 September
|-
! Total

Results and fixtures

Pre-season and friendlies

Liga Super 

Source: Fixtures / Result

Postponed matches

Results by matchday

Results summary

League table

Piala FA

Piala Malaysia

Group stage

Squad information

List of Players

Remarks:
U21 These players registered as Under-21 players at Piala Presiden competitions.
FP These players are considered as foreign players at Malaysia domestic football competitions.
LO These players are currently loan out to other clubs.

Formations first XI

Squad statistics
Key:
 = Appearances,
 = Goals,
M = Minutes played
 = Yellow card,
 = Red card
Player names in bold denotes player that left mid-season (loaned)(number in bracket denotes the players plays as a substitute in a match)

Statistics accurate as of 28 October 2017.

Goalscorers
{| class="wikitable sortable" style="font-size: 95%; text-align: center;"
|-
!width=10|
!width=10|
!width=10|
!width=170|Player
!width=50|Liga Super
!width=50|Piala FA
!width=50|Piala Malaysia
!width=50|Total
|-
|1
||FW
||22
|align=left| Mohammed Ghaddar
||18
||0
||0
||18
|-
|rowspan="1"|2
||MF
||18
|align=left| Mohd Khairul Izuan Rosli
||2
||0
||3
||5
|-
|rowspan="2"|3
||MF
||9
|align=left| Abou Bakr Al-Mel
||1
||0
||3
||4
|-
||FW
||29
|align=left| Alessandro Celin
||4
||0
||0
||4
|-
|rowspan="1"|5
||MF
||23
|align=left| Indra Putra Mahayuddin
||2
||1
||0
||3
|-
|rowspan="1"|6
||FW
||34
|align=left| Danial Ashraf
||2
||0
||0
||2
|-
|rowspan="4"|7
||DF
||12
|align=left| Mamadou Danso
||0
||0
||1
||1
|-
||MF
||14
|align=left| S. Thinagaran
||1
||0
||0
||1
|-
||MF
||16
|align=left| Mohd Badhri Mohd Radzi
||1
||0
||0
||1
|-
||MF
||21
|align=left| Morgaro Gomis
||0
||0
||1
||1
|-
|#
|colspan="3"|Own goals
|0
|0 
|0
|0 
|-
|- class="sortbottom"
|colspan=4|Totals
|31
|1
|8
|40

Hat-tricks

Note
4 Player scored 4 goals

Clean sheets 
{| class="wikitable sortable" style="font-size: 95%; text-align: center;"
|-
!width=10|
!width=10|
!width=170|Player
!Matches Played
!Conceded
!width=50|Liga Super
!width=50|Piala FA
!width=50|Piala Malaysia
|-
|1
| 1 ||align=left| Ramadhan Hamid
||15||26|| 1|| 0|| 0
|-
|rowspan=2|2
| 19 ||align=left| Khairul Fahmi Che Mat
||12||19|| 1|| 0|| 0 
|-
| 30 ||align=left| Mohd Shahrizan Ismail
||1||5|| 0|| 0|| 0 
|-
|- class="sortbottom"
| colspan="3"|Totals
|26||47||2 || 0 || 0 
|-

Discipline 

{| class="wikitable sortable" style="font-size: 95%; text-align: center;"
|- style="text-align:center;" 
! style="width:10px;" rowspan="2"|
! style="width:10px;" rowspan="2"|
! rowspan="2"| Player
! colspan="3"| Total
! colspan="3"| Liga Super
! colspan="3"| Piala FA
! colspan="3"| Piala Malaysia
|-
!  style="width:30px; background:#fe9;"| 
!  style="width:30px; background:#ff8888;"| 
!  style="width:30px; background:#ff8888;"| 
!  style="width:30px; background:#fe9;"| 
!  style="width:30px; background:#ff8888;"| 
!  style="width:30px; background:#ff8888;"| 
!  style="width:30px; background:#fe9;"| 
!  style="width:30px; background:#ff8888;"| 
!  style="width:30px; background:#ff8888;"| 
!  style="width:30px; background:#fe9;"| 
!  style="width:30px; background:#ff8888;"| 
!  style="width:30px; background:#ff8888;"| 
|-
| rowspan="1"| 1
| 8
|align=left|  Mohd Qayyum Marjoni Sabil
| style="background:#DCDCDC"| 4 
| style="background:#DCDCDC"| 0 
| style="background:#DCDCDC"| 1 
| 2 
| 0 
| 1 
| style="background:#DCDCDC"| 0 
| style="background:#DCDCDC"| 0 
| style="background:#DCDCDC"| 0 
| 2 
| 0 
| 0 
|-
| rowspan="2"| 2
| 21
|align=left|  Morgaro Gomis
| style="background:#DCDCDC"| 5 
| style="background:#DCDCDC"| 0 
| style="background:#DCDCDC"| 0 
| 5 
| 0 
| 0 
| style="background:#DCDCDC"| 0 
| style="background:#DCDCDC"| 0 
| style="background:#DCDCDC"| 0 
| 0 
| 0 
| 0 
|-
| 23
|align=left|  Indra Putra Mahayuddin
| style="background:#DCDCDC"| 5 
| style="background:#DCDCDC"| 0 
| style="background:#DCDCDC"| 0 
| 3 
| 0 
| 0 
| style="background:#DCDCDC"| 0 
| style="background:#DCDCDC"| 0 
| style="background:#DCDCDC"| 0 
| 2 
| 0 
| 0 
|-
| rowspan="1"| 4
| 35
|align=left|  Muhamad Fadhilah Mohd Pauzi
| style="background:#DCDCDC"| 4 
| style="background:#DCDCDC"| 0 
| style="background:#DCDCDC"| 0 
| 3 
| 0 
| 0 
| style="background:#DCDCDC"| 0 
| style="background:#DCDCDC"| 0 
| style="background:#DCDCDC"| 0 
| 1 
| 0 
| 0 
|-
| rowspan="5"| 5
| 3
|align=left|  S. Subramaniam
| style="background:#DCDCDC"| 2 
| style="background:#DCDCDC"| 0 
| style="background:#DCDCDC"| 0 
| 1 
| 0 
| 0 
| style="background:#DCDCDC"| 0 
| style="background:#DCDCDC"| 0 
| style="background:#DCDCDC"| 0 
| 1 
| 0 
| 0 
|-
| 12
|align=left|  Mamadou Danso
| style="background:#DCDCDC"| 2 
| style="background:#DCDCDC"| 0 
| style="background:#DCDCDC"| 0 
| 2 
| 0 
| 0 
| style="background:#DCDCDC"| 0 
| style="background:#DCDCDC"| 0 
| style="background:#DCDCDC"| 0 
| 0 
| 0 
| 0 
|-
| 10
|align=left|  Nor Farhan Muhammad
| style="background:#DCDCDC"| 2 
| style="background:#DCDCDC"| 0 
| style="background:#DCDCDC"| 0 
| 1 
| 0 
| 0 
| style="background:#DCDCDC"| 1 
| style="background:#DCDCDC"| 0 
| style="background:#DCDCDC"| 0 
| 0 
| 0 
| 0 
|-
| 15
|align=left|  Mohd Daudsu Jamaluddin
| style="background:#DCDCDC"| 2 
| style="background:#DCDCDC"| 0 
| style="background:#DCDCDC"| 0 
| 1 
| 0 
| 0 
| style="background:#DCDCDC"| 1 
| style="background:#DCDCDC"| 0 
| style="background:#DCDCDC"| 0 
| 0 
| 0 
| 0 
|-
| 29
|align=left|  Alessandro Celin
| style="background:#DCDCDC"| 2 
| style="background:#DCDCDC"| 0 
| style="background:#DCDCDC"| 0 
| 1 
| 0 
| 0 
| style="background:#DCDCDC"| 0 
| style="background:#DCDCDC"| 0 
| style="background:#DCDCDC"| 0 
| 1 
| 0 
| 0 
|-
| rowspan="8"| 10
| 6
|align=left|  Mohd Farisham Ismail
| style="background:#DCDCDC"| 1 
| style="background:#DCDCDC"| 0 
| style="background:#DCDCDC"| 0 
| 1 
| 0 
| 0 
| style="background:#DCDCDC"| 0 
| style="background:#DCDCDC"| 0 
| style="background:#DCDCDC"| 0 
| 0 
| 0 
| 0 
|-
| 14
|align=left|  S. Thinagaran
| style="background:#DCDCDC"| 1 
| style="background:#DCDCDC"| 0 
| style="background:#DCDCDC"| 0 
| 1 
| 0 
| 0 
| style="background:#DCDCDC"| 0 
| style="background:#DCDCDC"| 0 
| style="background:#DCDCDC"| 0 
| 0 
| 0 
| 0 
|-
| 34
|align=left|  Muhammad Danial Ashraf
| style="background:#DCDCDC"| 1 
| style="background:#DCDCDC"| 0 
| style="background:#DCDCDC"| 0 
| 1 
| 0 
| 0 
| style="background:#DCDCDC"| 0 
| style="background:#DCDCDC"| 0 
| style="background:#DCDCDC"| 0 
| 0 
| 0 
| 0 
|-
| 16
|align=left|  Mohd Badhri
| style="background:#DCDCDC"| 1 
| style="background:#DCDCDC"| 0 
| style="background:#DCDCDC"| 0 
| 1 
| 0 
| 0 
| style="background:#DCDCDC"| 0 
| style="background:#DCDCDC"| 0 
| style="background:#DCDCDC"| 0 
| 0 
| 0 
| 0 
|-
| 13
|align=left|  Abdul Aziz Ismail
| style="background:#DCDCDC"| 1 
| style="background:#DCDCDC"| 0 
| style="background:#DCDCDC"| 0 
| 1 
| 0 
| 0 
| style="background:#DCDCDC"| 0 
| style="background:#DCDCDC"| 0 
| style="background:#DCDCDC"| 0 
| 0 
| 0 
| 0 
|-
| 9
|align=left|  Abou Bakr Al-Mel
| style="background:#DCDCDC"| 1 
| style="background:#DCDCDC"| 0 
| style="background:#DCDCDC"| 0 
| 1 
| 0 
| 0 
| style="background:#DCDCDC"| 0 
| style="background:#DCDCDC"| 0 
| style="background:#DCDCDC"| 0 
| 0 
| 0 
| 0 
|-
| 20
|align=left|  Hattaphon Bun An
| style="background:#DCDCDC"| 1 
| style="background:#DCDCDC"| 0 
| style="background:#DCDCDC"| 0 
| 1 
| 0 
| 0 
| style="background:#DCDCDC"| 0 
| style="background:#DCDCDC"| 0 
| style="background:#DCDCDC"| 0 
| 0 
| 0 
| 0 
|-
| 27
|align=left|  Faizol Nazlin Sayuti
| style="background:#DCDCDC"| 1 
| style="background:#DCDCDC"| 0 
| style="background:#DCDCDC"| 0 
| 1 
| 0 
| 0 
| style="background:#DCDCDC"| 0 
| style="background:#DCDCDC"| 0 
| style="background:#DCDCDC"| 0 
| 1 
| 0 
| 0 
|-
! colspan="3"| Totals
! 34 
! 0 
! 1 
! 24 
! 0 
! 1 
! 2 
! 0 
! 0 
! 8 
! 0 
! 0 
|-

Suspensions

Summary
{|class="wikitable"
|-
|Games played || 29 (22 Liga Super) (1 Piala FA) (6 Piala Malaysia)
|-
|Games won || 9 (7 Liga Super) (2 Piala Malaysia)
|-
|Games drawn || 4 (4 Liga Super)
|-
|Games lost || 15 (10 Liga Super) (1 Piala FA) (4 Piala Malaysia)
|-
|Goals scored || 40 (31 Liga Super) (1 Piala FA) (8 Piala Malaysia)
|-
|Goals conceded ||  52 (39 Liga Super) (1 Piala FA) (12 Piala Malaysia)
|-
|Goal difference || –12  (–8 Liga Super) (0 Piala FA) (–4 Piala Malaysia)
|-
|Clean sheets || 2 (2 Liga Super) (0 Piala FA)(0 excluding friendly matches)
|-
|Yellow cards || 36 (27 Liga Super) (2 Piala FA) (8 Piala Malaysia)
|-
|Red cards || 1 (1 Liga Super) (0 Piala FA)
|-
|Most Yellow cards ||  Morgaro Gomis (5)  Indra Putra Mahayuddin (5)
|-
|Most Red cards ||  Mohd Qayyum (1)
|-
|Most appearances ||  Mamadou Danso (29)
|-
|Top scorer ||  Mohd Khairul Izuan Rosli (5 goals)
|-
|Winning Percentage || Overall: 9/29 (31.03%)
|-

Home Attendance

Source: Sistem Pengurusan Maklumat Bolasepak

Club officials

Board members

Board and management
President:  Bibi Ramjani Ilias Khan
Deputy President:  Afandi Hamzah
Vice President:  Mohd Aizuddin Mohd Ghazali, Nik Pakheruddin Nik Abdul Kadir, Nik Izani Nik Ibrahim
Secretary General:  Datuk Ismail Md Noor Ismail
Assistant Secretary General:  Wan Badri Wan Omar
Treasurer:  Nik Aminaldin Nik Jaafar

Senior club staff 
Team Manager:  Dato Seri Afandi Hamzah
Assistant Manager 1:  Datuk Muhammad Nasir Hamzah
Assistant Manager 2:  Amierul Hisham Lokman
Administration and Security Officer:  Datuk Seri Mohd Fared Abdul Ghani
Media Officer:  Md Zuki
Liaison Officer: Vacant

Coaching staff
Technical Director:  Alfredo Carlos Gonzales
Head coach:  Zahasmi Ismail
First assistant coach:  Satit Benso
Second assistant coach:  Sideek Shamsuddin
Goalkeeping coach:  Abdul Hamid Ramli
Fitness coach:  Ahmad Nizan Ariffin
Physiotherapist:  Muhammad Hishamuddin
Masseur:  Mohd Fitri
Kitman:  Harun Ismail
Kit coordinator:  Mohd Suhaimi Harun
Team doctor:  Dr Zahiruddin Abdullah Zawawi

Youth Coaching staff
Under-21s Manager:  Wan Rakemi Wan Zahari
Under-21s Assistant Manager:  Che Rastum Che Mood
Under-21s Head coach:  Mohd Hashim Mustapha
Under-21s Assistant coach:  Zahariman Ghazali
Under-21s Goalkeeping coach:  Halim Napi
Under-21s Physiotherapist:  Ahmad Faris Musa
Under-21s Security Officer:  Normizal Ismail
Under-21s Kitman:  Jusoh Jenal
Under-21s Team Coordinator:  Ghazali Husin
Under-21s Media Officer:  Ab Ghainizan Ab Bakar
Under-19s Manager:  Amril Aiman Ab Aziz
Under-19s Assistant Manager:  Danish Aklil Azlan
Under-19s Assistant Manager:  Ahmad Faizal Husain
Under-19s Head coach:  Sazami Shafii
Under-19s Assistant coach:  Nik Ahmad Fadly Nik Leh
Under-19s Goalkeeping coach:  Mohd Azam Othman
Under-19s Coordinator Officer:  Ahmad Faisal Othman
Under-19s Media Officer:  Fazuny Mohd Noor
Under-19s Kitman:  Noor Azmi Mohd Nor

Contracts

Transfers
First transfer window started in December 2017 to 22 January 2017 and Second transfer window will started on 15 May 2017 to 11 June 2017.

Transfers in

Transfers out

Loans out

Under 21s

Friendlies

Piala Presiden

Source: Fixtures / Standings

Appearances

Last updated: 26 September 2017

Under 19s

Source: Fixtures / Standings

Appearances

Last updated: 31 July 2017

Women's team

Source: Fixtures

Appearances

Last updated: 9 April 2017

References

2017
Malaysian football clubs 2017 season
Kelantan FA